Robert Guy Miranda (born April 10, 1952) is an American film and television actor. He is perhaps best known for playing the mobster Joey in the 1988 film Midnight Run.

Partial filmography 

1986: Inside Out as Sal
1987: The Untouchables as Gunned Head
1987: Highway to Heaven: Fight for Your Life as Jerry Zadan
1987: The Living Daylights as Pushkin's Hitman (uncredited)
1988: Midnight Run as Joey
1989: Miami Vice  - TV series , episodio 5x12 "Jack of All Trades" (1989)
1990: My Blue Heaven as Lilo Mello
1990: Sons as Fred
1991: The Rocketeer as Spanish Johnny (as Robert Guy Miranda)
1992: Sister Act as Joey
1993: Lost in Yonkers as Hollywood Harry (as Robert Guy Miranda)
1993: Desire as Nick Palermo
1994: Huck and the King of Hearts as Happy
1994: Monkey Trouble as Drake 
1995: Heat as Cusmano (uncredited)
1996: For Which He Stands as Johnny's Lawyer
1996: Eraser as Frediano
1996: Judge and Jury as Coach Wagner
1996* Gotti as Frank Decicco
1996: The Devil Takes a Holiday as Vinnie Grannucci
1997: Steel Sharks as Gregorov
1998: Black Thunder as Rojar
1999: Blue Streak as Glennfidish
1999: Scriptfella's as Leo
2000: Thirteen Days as RFK's Driver
2001: Cowboy Up as Eddie (as Robert G. Miranda)
2002: Virginia's Run as Blake Raines (as Robert Guy Miranda)
2002: Deuces Wild as Gino
2004: Target as Officer D'Angelo
2004: The Last Letter as Mr. Pickett
2016: The Unlikely's as Buck Cringle
2017: Pizza with Bullets as Louis Parchessi
2017: Proximity to Power

References

External links 

Living people
1952 births
People from New Orleans
Male actors from New Orleans
American male film actors
American male television actors
20th-century American male actors
21st-century American male actors